Richard Mock (1944 – July 28, 2006) was a printmaker, painter, sculptor, and editorial cartoonist. Mock was best known for his linocut illustrations that appeared on the Op-Ed page of The New York Times from 1980 through 1996.

Born in 1944 in Long Beach, California, Mock earned his bachelor's degree, studying lithography and block printing, at the University of Michigan. Settling in New York City in 1968, Mock had exhibitions at 112 Greene Street, The Whitney (in 1973), Exit Art, and his most recent show at the Sideshow Gallery in Brooklyn. In addition, Mock's art frequently appeared on the covers of the magazines Fifth Estate (Official site: www.FifthEstate.org), Alternative Press Review and Anarchy: A Journal of Desire Armed. His work has been cited as an influence by a number of contemporary American printmakers, among them Tom Huck and Bill Fick.  Huck and Fick are both members of a group of artists known as the "Outlaw Printmakers", which as a collective unit cite Mock's work as one of its main influences.

Mock died on July 28, 2006, after a long illness.

Trivia
Mock was named the official portrait painter of the 1980 Olympics.

References

Richard Mock's linocuts were frequently featured opposite the NY Times Op Ed page

Further reading 

 Antliff, Allan. "Richard Mock (1944–2006): an appreciation." Anarchist Studies, vol. 14, no. 2, 2006, p. 99–.

External links
 Obituary and photos of prints at Alley Culture

1944 births
2006 deaths
20th-century American painters
American male painters
21st-century American painters
Penny W. Stamps School of Art & Design alumni
20th-century American sculptors
20th-century male artists
American male sculptors
American anarchists